Hridoy Khan (born 3 January 1991) is a Bangladeshi singer, music composer, musical artist and actor."Team Hridoy Khan"

Khan comes from a musical background. His grandfather is a music teacher, and his father composes jingles. Khan released his first album, Hridoy Mix I, in 2008 at age 17. His first solo album, Bol Na, followed the next year. By late 2014, he had released four more albums, Hridoy Mix-2, Chhowa, Hridoy Mix-3 and Bhalo Lage Na.

Film soundtracks
 Amar Praner Priya (2009)
 Chorabali (2012)
 I Love You (2012)
 Most Welcome (2012)
 Ant Story (2013)
 Eito Bhalobasa (2013)
 Television (2012)
 Ami Shudhu Cheyechi Tomay (2014)
 Love Marriage  (2015)
 Aro Bhalobashbo Tomay (2015)
 Sweetheart (2016)

Personal life
Khan married Purnima Akter in 2010. The marriage lasted six months. He married Sumaiya Zafar Suzana, a model, in August 2014, after a relationship of three and a half years. The couple divorced in April 2015. In September 2017, he married Humaira.

References

Living people
21st-century Bangladeshi male singers
21st-century Bangladeshi singers
Bangladeshi composers
Bangladeshi music directors
Place of birth missing (living people)
Bangladeshi guitarists
Laser Vision artists
1990 births
CJFB Performance Award Winners